Thana is the biggest city of Malakand District. The name is derived from the Pashto word "Thanrha" which means "Place Of Courting", and was a main political center during the tribal period. The literacy Rate in the city is approximately 72% and the
poverty rate is approx 24%. The nominal GDP of the city Thana is approx $690 million.

History 
The history of the region can be traced back to 3000 BC, which is evident from the remains present at Nookano Gund near Mora Sar. The first graveyard was also discovered here in 1964 by Hassan Dani and Munawar Khan of Thana. The town is populated by 200,000 people, of which 74,000 are registered voters.

The whole division was previously Malakand agency inclusive of the princely states of Swat, Dir, Amb and Chitral. Kalam and upper Swat was part of Malakand Agency until 1969. The college was commissioned in 1962 and now houses five colleges.

Thana is bounded by Jalala to the east, Pul Chowki to the west, the Swat river to the north and Palai to the south. Geographically Thana is divided into three parts, Thana Khas, Thana Jaded and Thana Bandajat. Owing to the fertile soil, Thana is the producer of different vegetables and fruits. It exports many important vegetables and fruits to other parts of Khyber Pakhtunkhwa and Pakistan, including tomatoes, matar (peas), and fruits include plums, apricots, persimmons, and peaches.

References

Populated places in Malakand District